The Isle of Skye, or simply Skye (or), is the largest and northernmost of the major islands in the Inner Hebrides of Scotland. The island's peninsulas radiate from a mountainous hub dominated by the Cuillin, the rocky slopes of which provide some of the most dramatic mountain scenery in the country. Although  has been suggested to describe a winged shape, no definitive agreement exists as to the name's origins.

The island has been occupied since the Mesolithic period, and over its history has been occupied at various times by Celtic tribes including the Picts and the Gaels, Scandinavian Vikings, and most notably the powerful integrated Norse-Gaels clans of 
MacLeod and MacDonald. The island was considered to be under Norwegian suzerainty until the 1266 Treaty of Perth, which transferred control over to Scotland. The 18th-century Jacobite risings led to the breaking-up of the clan system and later clearances that replaced entire communities with sheep farms, some of which involved forced emigrations to distant lands. Resident numbers declined from over 20,000 in the early 19th century to just under 9,000 by the closing decade of the 20th century. Skye's population increased by 4% between 1991 and 2001. About a third of the residents were Gaelic speakers in 2001, and although their numbers are in decline, this aspect of island culture remains important.

The main industries are tourism, agriculture, fishing, and forestry. Skye is part of the Highland Council local government area. The island's largest settlement is Portree, which is also its capital, known for its picturesque harbour. Links to various nearby islands by ferry are available, and since 1995, to the mainland by a road bridge. The climate is mild, wet, and windy. The abundant wildlife includes the golden eagle, red deer, and Atlantic salmon. The local flora is dominated by heather moor, and  nationally important invertebrate populations live on the surrounding sea bed. Skye has provided the locations for various novels and feature films, and is celebrated in poetry and song.

Etymology

The first written references to the island are Roman sources such as the Ravenna Cosmography, which refers to Scitis and Scetis, which can be found on a map by Ptolemy. One possible derivation comes from skitis, an early Celtic word for "winged", which may describe how the island's peninsulas radiate out from a mountainous centre. Subsequent Gaelic-, Norse- and English-speaking peoples have influenced the history of Skye; the relationships between their names for the island are not straightforward. Various etymologies have been proposed, such as the "winged isle" or "the notched isle", but no definitive solution has been found to date; the place name may be from an earlier, non-Gaelic language.

In 1549, Donald Munro, High Dean of the Isles, wrote of "Sky": "" but the meaning of this Gaelic name is unclear.

, which means "island of the mist" (a translation of the Norse name), is a poetic Gaelic name for the island.

Geography

At , Skye is the second-largest island in Scotland after Lewis and Harris. The coastline of Skye is a series of peninsulas and bays radiating out from a centre dominated by the Cuillin hills. Malcolm Slesser suggested that its shape "sticks out of the west coast of northern Scotland like a lobster's claw ready to snap at the fish bone of Harris and Lewis" and W. H. Murray, commenting on its irregular coastline, stated, "Skye is 60 miles [100 km] long, but what might be its breadth is beyond the ingenuity of man to state".
Martin Martin, a native of the island, reported on it at length in a 1703 publication. His geological observations included a note that:

The Black Cuillin, which are mainly composed of basalt and gabbro, include 12 Munros and provide some of the most dramatic and challenging mountain terrain in Scotland. Nearby Sgùrr Alasdair, meanwhile, is the tallest mountain on any Scottish island. These hills make demands of the hill walker that exceed any others found in Scotland and a full traverse of the Cuillin ridge may take 15–20 hours. The Red Hills to the east are also known as the Red Cuillin. They are mainly composed of granite that has weathered into more rounded hills with many long scree slopes on their flanks. The highest point of these hills is Glamaig, one of only two Corbetts on Skye.

The northern peninsula of Trotternish is underlain by basalt, which provides relatively rich soils and a variety of unusual rock features. The Kilt Rock is named after the columnar structure of the  cliffs, said to resemble the pleats in a kilt. The Quiraing is a spectacular series of rock pinnacles on the eastern side of the main spine of the peninsula and further south is the rock pillar of the Old Man of Storr. The view of the Quiraing and the Old Man of Storr is one of the most iconic in all of Scotland, and is frequently used on calendars and tourism guides and brochures.

Beyond Loch Snizort to the west of Trotternish is the Waternish peninsula, which ends in Ardmore Point's double rock arch. Duirinish peninsula is separated from Waternish by Loch Dunvegan, which contains the island of Isay. It is ringed by sea cliffs that reach  on the west at Waterstein Head and on the northwest at Biod an Athair where, a metre from the summit trig pillar, the cliffs drop  to the ocean. Oolitic loam provides good arable land in the main valley. Lochs Bracadale and Harport and the island of Wiay lie between Duirinish and Minginish, which includes the narrower defiles of Talisker and Glen Brittle and whose beaches are formed from black basaltic sands. Strathaird is a relatively small peninsula close to the Cuillin hills with only a few crofting communities, the island of Soay lies offshore. The bedrock of Sleat in the south is Torridonian sandstone, which produces poor soils and boggy ground, although its lower elevations and relatively sheltered eastern shores enable a lush growth of hedgerows and crops. The islands of Raasay, Rona, Scalpay and Pabay all lie to the north and east between Skye and the mainland.

Towns and villages

Portree in the north at the base of Trotternish is the largest settlement (estimated population 2,264 in 2011) and is the main service centre on the island. A December 2018 report recommended the village as "Skye's best home base" for visitors", since it has "a few hotels, hostels and bed-and-breakfasts in town, while more B&Bs line the roads into and out of town". The village also has "banks, churches, cafes and restaurants, a cinema at the Aros Centre, a swimming pool and library ... fuel filling stations and supermarkets".

Broadford, the location of the island's only airstrip, is on the east side of the island and Dunvegan in the north-west is well known for its castle and the nearby Three Chimneys restaurant. The 18th-century Stein Inn on the Waternish coast is the oldest pub on Skye. Kyleakin is linked to Kyle of Lochalsh on the mainland by the Skye Bridge, which spans the narrows of Loch Alsh. Uig, the port for ferries to the Outer Hebrides, is on the west of the Trotternish peninsula and Edinbane is between Dunvegan and Portree. Much of the rest of the population lives in crofting townships scattered around the coastline.

Climate
The influence of the Atlantic Ocean and the Gulf Stream create a mild oceanic climate. Snow seldom lies at sea level and frosts are less frequent than on the mainland. Winds are a limiting factor for vegetation. South-westerlies are the most common and speeds of  have been recorded. High winds are especially likely on the exposed coasts of Trotternish and Waternish. Variations can be considerable, with the north tending to be drier than the south. Trotternish typically has 200 hours of bright sunshine in May, the sunniest month. On 28 December 2015, the temperature reached 15 °C, beating the previous December record of 12.9 °C, set in 2013. On 9 May 2016, a temperature of 26.7 °C (80.1 °F) was recorded at Lusa in the south-east of the island.

History

Prehistory
Its occupation is probably linked to that of the rock shelter at Sand, Applecross, on the mainland coast of Wester Ross, where tools made of a mudstone from  have been found. Surveys of the area between the two shores of the Inner Sound and Sound of Raasay have revealed 33 sites with potentially Mesolithic deposits. Finds of bloodstone microliths on the foreshore at Orbost on the west coast of the island near Dunvegan also suggest Mesolithic occupation. Similarly, bloodstone from Rum, and baked mudstone, from the Staffin area, were found at the Mesolithic site of Camas Daraich, also from the seventh millennium BC, on the Point of Sleat, which has led archaeologists to believe that Mesolithic people on Skye would travel fairly significant distances, at least 70 km, both by land and sea.

, an uninhabited peninsula to the south of the Cuillin, has a variety of archaeological sites dating from the Neolithic onwards. A second- or third-millennium BC chambered cairn, an Iron Age promontory fort, and the remains of another prehistoric settlement dating from the Bronze Age are nearby.  on the peninsula is linked to the sea by an artificial "Viking" canal that may date from the later period of Norse settlement. Dun Ringill is a ruined Iron Age hill fort on the Strathaird Peninsula, which was further fortified in the Middle Ages and may have become the seat of Clan MacKinnon.

Early history
The late Iron Age inhabitants of the northern and western Hebrides were probably Pictish, although the historical record is sparse. Three Pictish symbol stones have been found on Skye and a fourth on Raasay. The Irish annals record a number of events on Skye in the later seventh and early eighth centuries – mainly concerning the struggles between rival dynasties that formed the background to the Old Irish language romance .

Legendary hero Cú Chulainn is said to have trained on the Isle of Skye with warrior woman Scáthach.

The Norse held sway throughout the Hebrides from the 9th century until after the Treaty of Perth in 1266. However, apart from placenames, little remains of their presence on Skye in the written or archaeological record. Apart from the name "Skye" itself, all pre-Norse placenames seem to have been obliterated by the Scandinavian settlers. Viking heritage, with Celtic heritage is claimed by Clan MacLeod. Norse tradition is celebrated in the winter fire festival at Dunvegan, during which a replica Viking long boat is set alight.

Clans and Scottish rule
The most powerful clans on Skye in the post–Norse period were Clan MacLeod, originally based in Trotternish, and Clan Macdonald of Sleat. The isle was held by Donald Macdonald, Lord of the Isles’ half-brother, Godfrey, from 1389 until 1401, at which time Skye was declared part of Ross. When the Donald Macdonald, Lord of the Isles, re-gained Ross after the battle of Harlaw in 1411, they added "Earl of Ross" to their lords' titles. Skye came with Ross.

Following the disintegration of the Lordship of the Isles, Clan Mackinnon also emerged as an independent clan, whose substantial landholdings in Skye were centred on Strathaird. Clan MacNeacail also have a long association with Trotternish, and in the 16th century many of the MacInnes clan moved to Sleat. The MacDonalds of South Uist were bitter rivals of the MacLeods, and an attempt by the former to murder church-goers at Trumpan in retaliation for a previous massacre on Eigg, resulted in the Battle of the Spoiling Dyke of 1578.

After the failure of the Jacobite rebellion of 1745, Flora MacDonald became famous for rescuing Prince Charles Edward Stuart from the Hanoverian troops. Although she was born on South Uist, her story is strongly associated with their escape via Skye, and she is buried at Kilmuir in Trotternish. Samuel Johnson and James Boswell's visit to Skye in 1773 and their meeting with Flora MacDonald in Kilmuir is recorded in Boswell's The Journal of a Tour to the Hebrides. Boswell wrote, "To see Dr Samuel Johnson, the great champion of the English Tories, salute Miss Flora MacDonald in the isle of Sky, was a striking sight; for though somewhat congenial in their notions, it was very improbable they should meet here". Johnson's words that Flora MacDonald was "A name that will be mentioned in history, and if courage and fidelity be virtues, mentioned with honour" are written on her gravestone. After this rebellion, the clan system was broken up and Skye became a series of landed estates.

Of the island in general, Johnson observed:

Skye has a rich heritage of ancient monuments from this period. Dunvegan Castle has been the seat of Clan MacLeod since the 13th century. It contains the Fairy Flag and is reputed to have been inhabited by a single family for longer than any other house in Scotland. The 18th-century Armadale Castle, once home of Clan Donald of Sleat, was abandoned as a residence in 1925, but now hosts the Clan Donald Centre. Nearby are the ruins of two more MacDonald strongholds, Knock Castle, and Dunscaith Castle (called "Fortress of Shadows"), the legendary home of warrior woman, martial arts instructor (and, according to some sources, Queen) . , a fortress built in the late 15th century near Kyleakin and once a seat of Clan MacKinnon, is another ruin.

Economic turmoil and mass emigration

In the late 18th century the harvesting of kelp became a significant activity, but from 1822 onward cheap imports led to a collapse of this industry throughout the Hebrides. During the 19th century, the inhabitants of Skye were also devastated by famine and Clearances. Thirty thousand people were evicted between 1840 and 1880 alone, many of them forced to emigrate to the New World. The "Battle of the Braes" involved a demonstration against a lack of access to land and the serving of eviction notices. The incident involved numerous crofters and about 50 police officers. This event was instrumental in the creation of the Napier Commission, which reported in 1884 on the situation in the Highlands. Disturbances continued until the passing of the 1886 Crofters' Act and on one occasion 400 marines were deployed on Skye to maintain order. The ruins of cleared villages can still be seen at Lorgill, Boreraig and Suisnish in Strath Swordale, and Tusdale on Minginish.

Overview of population trends

As with many Scottish islands, Skye's population peaked in the 19th century and then declined under the impact of the Clearances and the military losses in the First World War. From the 19th century until 1975 Skye was part of the county of Inverness-shire, but the crofting economy languished and according to Slesser, "Generations of UK governments have treated the island people contemptuously" --a charge that has been levelled at both Labour and Conservative administrations' policies in the Highlands and Islands. By 1971 the population was less than a third of its peak recorded figure in 1841. However, the number of residents then grew by over 28 per cent in the thirty years to 2001. The changing relationship between the residents and the land is evidenced by Robert Carruthers's remark circa 1852 that, "There is now a village in Portree containing three hundred inhabitants." Even if this estimate is inexact the population of the island's largest settlement has probably increased sixfold or more since then. During the period the total number of island residents has declined by 50 per cent or more.The island-wide population increase of 4 per cent between 1991 and 2001 occurred against the background of an overall reduction in Scottish island populations of 3 per cent for the same period. By 2011 the population had risen a further 8.4% to 10,008 with Scottish island populations as a whole growing by 4% to 103,702.

Language

Historically, Skye was overwhelmingly Gaelic-speaking, but this changed between 1921 and 2001. In both the 1901 and 1921 censuses, all Skye parishes were more than 75 percent Gaelic-speaking. By 1971, only Kilmuir parish had more than three-quarters Gaelic speakers while the rest of Skye ranged between 50 and 74 per cent. At that time, Kilmuir was the only area outside the Western Isles that had such a high proportion of Gaelic speakers. In the 2001 census Kilmuir had just under half Gaelic speakers, and overall, Skye had 31 per cent, distributed unevenly. The strongest Gaelic areas were in the north and south-west of the island, including Staffin at 61 per cent. The weakest areas were in the west and east (e.g. Luib 23 per cent and Kylerhea 19 per cent). Other areas on Skye ranged between 48 per cent and 25 per cent.

Government and politics

In terms of local government, from 1975 to 1996, Skye, along with the neighbouring mainland area of Lochalsh, constituted a local government district within the Highland administrative area. In 1996 the district was included into the unitary Highland Council, based in Inverness and formed one of the new council's area committees. Following the 2007 elections, Skye now forms a four-member ward called ; it is currently represented by two independents, one Scottish National Party, and one Liberal Democrat councillor.

Skye is in the Highlands and Islands electoral region and comprises a part of the Skye, Lochaber and Badenoch constituency of the Scottish Parliament, which elects one member under the first past the post basis to represent it. Kate Forbes is the current MSP for the SNP. In addition, Skye forms part of the wider Ross, Skye and Lochaber constituency, which elects one member to the House of Commons in Westminster. The present MP Member of Parliament is Ian Blackford of the Scottish National Party, who took office after the SNP's sweep in the General Election of 2015. Prior to this, Charles Kennedy, a Liberal Democrat, had represented the area since the 1983 general election.

Economy

The largest employer on the island and its environs is the public sector, which accounts for about a third of the total workforce, principally in administration, education and health. The second-largest employer in the area is the distribution, hotels and restaurants sector, highlighting the importance of tourism. Key attractions include Dunvegan Castle, the Clan Donald Visitor Centre, and The Aros Experience arts and exhibition centre in Portree. There are about a dozen large landowners on Skye, the largest being the public sector, with the Scottish Government owning most of the northern part of the island. Glendale is a community-owned estate in Duirinish, and the Sleat Community Trust, the local development trust, is active in various regeneration projects.

Small firms dominate employment in the private sector. The Talisker Distillery, which produces a single malt whisky, is beside Loch Harport on the west coast of the island. Torabhaig distillery located in Teangue opened in 2017 and also produces whisky. These are marketed using predominantly Gaelic-language labels. The blended whisky branded as "Isle of Skye" is produced not on the island but by the Glengoyne Distillery at Killearn north of Glasgow, though the website of the owners, Ian Macleod Distillers Ltd., boasts a "high proportion of Island malts" and contains advertisements for tourist businesses in the island. There is also an established software presence on Skye, with Portree-based Sitekit having expanded in recent years.

Crofting is still important, but although there are about 2,000 crofts on Skye only 100 or so are large enough to enable a crofter to earn a livelihood entirely from the land. In recent years, families have complained about the increasing prices for land that make it difficult for young people to start their own crofts.

Cod and herring stocks have declined but commercial fishing remains important, especially fish farming of salmon and shellfish such as scampi. The west coast of Scotland has a considerable renewable energy potential and the Isle of Skye Renewables Co-op has recently bought a stake in the Ben Aketil wind farm near Dunvegan. There is a thriving arts and crafts sector.

The unemployment rate in the area tends to be higher than in the Highlands as a whole, and is seasonal in nature, in part due to the impact of tourism. The population is growing and in common with many other scenic rural areas in Scotland, significant increases are expected in the percentage of the population aged 45 to 64 years.

The restrictions required by the worldwide pandemic increased unemployment in the Highlands and Islands in summer 2020 to 5.7%; that was significantly higher than the 2.4 per cent in 2019. The rates were said to be highest in "Lochaber, Skye and Wester Ross and Argyll and the Islands". A December 2020 report stated that between March (just before the effects of pandemic were noted) and December, the unemployment rate in the region increased by "more than 97%" and suggested that the outlook was even worse for spring 2021.

Tourism

A report published in mid-2020 indicated that visitors to Skye added £211 million in 2019 to the island's economy, prior to travel restrictions imposed because of the COVID-19 pandemic. The report added that "Skye and Raasay attracted 650,000 visitors [in 2018] and supported 2,850 jobs". The government estimated that tourism in Scotland would decline by over 50% as a result of the pandemic. "Skye is highly vulnerable to the downturn in international visitors that will continue for much of 2020 and beyond", Professor John Lennon of Glasgow Caledonian University told a reporter in July 2020.

Tourism in the Highlands and Islands was negatively impacted by the pandemic, the effects of which continued into 2021. A September 2020 report stated that the region "has been disproportionately impacted by the COVID-19 pandemic to date, when compared to Scotland and the UK as a whole". The industry required short term support for "business survival and recovery" and that was expected to continue as the sector was "severely impacted for as long as physical distancing and travel restrictions". A scheme called Island Equivalent was introduced by the Scottish government in early 2021 to financially assist hospitality and retail businesses "affected by Level 3 coronavirus restrictions". Previous schemes in 2020 included the Strategic Framework Business Fund and the Coronavirus Business Support Fund.

Prior to the pandemic, during summer 2017, islanders complained about an excessive number of tourists, which was causing overcrowding in popular locations such Glen Brittle, the Neist Point lighthouse and at the Quiraing and the Old Man of Storr. "Skye is buckling under the weight of increased tourism this year", said the operator of a self-catering cottage; the problem was most significant at "the key iconic destinations, like the Old Man of Storr and the Quiraing", he added. Chris Taylor of VisitScotland sympathised with the concerns and said that the agency was working on a long-term solution. "But the benefits to Skye of bringing in international visitors and increased spending are huge," he added.

An article published in 2020 confirmed that (prior to the pandemic), the Talisker Distillery and Dunvegan Castle were still overcrowded in peak periods; other areas where parking was a problem due to large crowds included "the Old Man of Storr, Kilt Rock, the Quiraing, the Fairy Pools, and Neist Point. This source also stated that Portree was "the busiest place on the island" during peak periods and suggested that some tourists might prefer accommodations in quieter areas such as "Dunvegan, Kyleakin and the Broadford and Breakish area".

Transport
Skye is linked to the mainland by the Skye Bridge, while ferries sail from Armadale on the island to Mallaig, and from Kylerhea to Glenelg, crossing the Kyle Rhea strait. Ferries also run from Uig to Tarbert on Harris and Lochmaddy on North Uist, and from Sconser to Raasay.

The Skye Bridge opened in 1995 under a private finance initiative and the high tolls charged (£5.70 each way for summer visitors) met with widespread opposition, spearheaded by the pressure group SKAT (Skye and Kyle Against Tolls). On 21 December 2004 it was announced that the Scottish Executive had purchased the bridge from its owners and the tolls were immediately removed.

Bus services run to Inverness and Glasgow, and there are local services on the island, mainly starting from Portree or Broadford. Train services run from Kyle of Lochalsh at the mainland end of the Skye Bridge to Inverness, as well as from Glasgow to Mallaig from where the ferry can be caught to Armadale.

The A87 trunk road traverses the island from the Skye Bridge to Uig, linking most of the major settlements. Many of the island's roads have been widened in the past forty years although there are still substantial sections of single track road.

Culture, media, and the arts

Students of Scottish Gaelic travel from all over the world to attend , the Scottish Gaelic college based near Kilmore in Sleat. In addition to members of the Church of Scotland and a smaller number of Roman Catholics, many residents of Skye belong to the Free Church of Scotland, known for its strict observance of the Sabbath.

Skye has a strong folk music tradition, although in recent years dance and rock music have been growing in popularity on the island. Gaelic folk rock band Runrig started in Skye and former singer Donnie Munro still works on the island. Runrig's second single and a concert staple is entitled Skye, the lyrics being partly in English and partly in Gaelic and they have released other songs such as "Nightfall on Marsco" that were inspired by the island. Ex-Runrig member Blair Douglas, a highly regarded accordionist and composer in his own right, was born on the island and is still based there to this day. Celtic fusion band the Peatbog Faeries are based on Skye. Jethro Tull singer Ian Anderson owned an estate at Strathaird on Skye at one time. Several Tull songs are written about Skye, including Dun Ringil, Broadford Bazaar, and Acres Wild (which contains the lines "Come with me to the Winged Isle, / Northern father's western child..." in reference to the island itself). The Isle of Skye Music Festival featured sets from The Fun Lovin' Criminals and Sparks, but collapsed in 2007. Electronic musician Mylo was born on Skye.

The poet Sorley MacLean, a native of the Isle of Raasay, which lies off the island's east coast, lived much of his life on Skye. The island has been immortalised in the traditional song "The Skye Boat Song" and is the notional setting for the novel To the Lighthouse by Virginia Woolf, although the Skye of the novel bears little relation to the real island. The international bestseller, The Ice Twins, by S K Tremayne, published around the world in 2015–2016, is set in southern Skye, especially around the settlement and islands of Isleornsay.

Skye has been used as a location for a number of feature films. The Ashaig aerodrome was used for the opening scenes of the 1980 film Flash Gordon. Stardust, released in 2007 and starring Robert De Niro and Michelle Pfeiffer, featured scenes near Uig, Loch Coruisk and the Quiraing. Another 2007 film, : The Inaccessible Pinnacle, was shot almost entirely in various locations on the island. The Justin Kurzel adaption of Macbeth starring Michael Fassbender was also filmed on the Island. Some of the opening scenes in Ridley Scott's 2012 feature film Prometheus were shot and set at the Old Man of Storr. In 1973 The Highlands and Islands - a Royal Tour, a documentary about Prince Charles's visit to the Highlands and Islands, directed by Oscar Marzaroli, was shot partly on Skye. Scenes from the Scottish Gaelic-language BBC Alba television series Bannan were filmed on the island.

The West Highland Free Press is published at Broadford. This weekly newspaper takes as its motto  ("The Land, the Language and the People"), which reflects its radical, campaigning priorities. The Free Press was founded in 1972 and circulates in Skye, Wester Ross and the Outer Hebrides. Shinty is a popular sport played throughout the island and Portree-based Skye Camanachd won the Camanachd Cup in 1990.

Whilst Skye had unofficial flags in the past, including the popular "Bratach nan Daoine" (Flag of the People) design which represented the Cuillins in sky blue against a white sky symbolising the Gaelic language, land struggle and the fairy flag of Dunvegan, the Island received its first official flag "Bratach an Eilein" (The Skye Flag) approved by the Lord Lyon after a public vote in August 2020. The design by Calum Alasdair Munro  reflects the Island's Gaelic heritage, the Viking heritage and the history of Flora MacDonald. The flag has a birlinn in the canton, and there are five oars representing the five areas of Skye, Trotternish, Waternish, Duirinish, Minginish and Sleat. Yellow represents the MacLeods, and Blue the MacDonalds or the MacKinnons.

Wildlife
The Hebrides generally lack the biodiversity of mainland Britain, but like most of the larger islands, Skye still has a wide variety of species. Observing the abundance of game birds Martin wrote:

Similarly, Samuel Johnson noted that:

In the modern era avian life includes the corncrake, red-throated diver, kittiwake, tystie, Atlantic puffin, goldeneye and golden eagle. The eggs of the last breeding pair of white-tailed sea eagle in the UK were taken by an egg collector on Skye in 1916 but the species has recently been re-introduced. The chough last bred on the island in 1900. Mountain hare (apparently absent in the 18th century) and rabbit are now abundant and preyed upon by wild cat and pine marten. The rich fresh water streams contain brown trout, Atlantic salmon and water shrew. Offshore the edible crab and edible oyster are also found, the latter especially in the Sound of Scalpay. There are nationally important horse mussel and brittlestar beds in the sea lochs and in 2012 a bed of 100 million flame shells was found during a survey of Loch Alsh. Grey Seals can be seen off the Southern coast.

Heather moor containing ling, bell heather, cross-leaved heath, bog myrtle and fescues is everywhere abundant. The high Black Cuillins weather too slowly to produce a soil that sustains a rich plant life, but each of the main peninsulas has an individual flora. The basalt underpinnings of Trotternish produce a diversity of Arctic and alpine plants including alpine pearlwort and mossy cyphal. The low-lying fields of Waternish contain corn marigold and corn spurry. The sea cliffs of Duirinish boast mountain avens and fir clubmoss. Minginish produces fairy flax, cats-ear and black bog rush. There is a fine example of Brachypodium-rich ash woodland at Tokavaig in Sleat incorporating silver birch, hazel, bird cherry, and hawthorn.

The local Biodiversity Action Plan recommends land management measures to control the spread of ragwort and bracken and identifies four non-native, invasive species as threatening native biodiversity: Japanese knotweed, rhododendron, New Zealand flatworm and mink. It also identifies problems of over-grazing resulting in the impoverishment of moorland and upland habitats and a loss of native woodland, caused by the large numbers of red deer and sheep.

In 2020 Clan MacLeod chief Hugh MacLeod announced a plan to reintroduce 370,000 native trees along with beaver and red squirrel populations to the clan estates on Skye, with a view to restoring a "wet desert" landscape which had depleted from years of overgrazing.

See also 

 List of islands of Scotland
 :Category:Mountains and hills of the Isle of Skye
 Timeline of prehistoric Scotland

Notes

Citations

References
 
 
 
 
 
  First published in 1947 under title: Natural history in the Highlands & Islands; by F. Fraser Darling.
 
 Gammeltoft, Peder "Scandinavian Naming-Systems in the Hebrides – A Way of Understanding how the Scandinavians were in Contact with Gaels and Picts?" in 
 
 
 
 Jennings, Andrew, and Kruse, Arne, "One Coast – Three Peoples: Names and Ethnicity in the Scottish West during the Early Viking period" in 
 
 
 
  First printed for Andrew Bell and others, London.

External links

 Skye - Wikivoyage
 An historical perspective of Skye from the Ordnance Gazetteer of Scotland: A Survey of Scottish Topography, Statistical, Biographical and Historical, edited by Francis H. Groome. Originally published between 1882 and 1885 and provided on-line by the Gazetteer for Scotland.
 Skye photos
 Skye Flora
 Skye Birding Guide

 
Islands of Highland (council area)
Islands of the Inner Hebrides
Islands of the United Kingdom
Cleared places in the Inner Hebrides